Ellen Bang (16 May 1906 – 8 November 1981) was a German film actress. She appeared in thirty films between 1934 and 1950.

Selected filmography
 Don't Lose Heart, Suzanne! (1935)
 My Friend Barbara (1937)
 The Gambler (1938)
 Yvette (1938)
 The Green Emperor (1939)
 In the Name of the People (1939)
 The Fox of Glenarvon (1940)
 I'll Carry You in My Arms (1943)
 Somewhere in Berlin (1946)
 The Woman from Last Night (1950)

References

Bibliography

External links

1906 births
1981 deaths
German film actresses
20th-century German actresses